Alexander Gottfried Friedrich Gode-von Aesch (October 30, 1906 – August 10, 1970) was a German-born American linguist, translator and the driving force behind the creation of the auxiliary language Interlingua.

Biography
Born to a German father and a Swiss mother, Gode studied at the University of Vienna and the University of Paris before leaving for the U.S. and becoming a citizen in 1927. He was an instructor at the University of Chicago as well as Columbia University, where he received his Ph.D. in Germanic Studies in 1939.

Alexander Gode died of cancer in hospital. He was preceded in death by his first wife, Johanna. Gode was survived by two daughters from his first marriage, his second wife Alison, and their two children.

Interlingua
Gode was involved with the International Auxiliary Language Association (IALA) from 1933 on, sporadically at first. In 1936 the IALA began development of a new international auxiliary language and in 1939 Gode was hired to assist in this work.

After André Martinet was brought in to head the research in 1946, the two men's views came into conflict as Gode thought that Martinet was trying to schematize the new language too much, conflating it with Occidental. Gode saw no need to invent a language, as a product of some a-priori design. Instead, he and the former director of research, Ezra Clark Stillman, wanted to record the international vocabulary that, in their view, already existed. This would be done – and was being done before Martinet – by systematically extracting and modifying words from the existing control languages in such a way that they could be seen as dialects of a common language, with their own specific peculiarities. When Martinet resigned in 1948 over a salary dispute, Gode took up leadership and got full reign in implementing this vision. The result was Interlingua, the dictionary and grammar of which were published in 1951.

In 1953, the role of IALA was assumed by the Interlingua Division of Science Service, and Gode became the division director. He continued his involvement with Interlingua until his death by translating scientific and medical texts into it. He won awards for this from the American Medical Writers Association and the International Federation of Translators.

American Translators Association
Gode was one of the founders and first president of the American Translators Association (1960–1963). In his honor, this organization awards the Alexander Gode Medal "for outstanding service to the translation and interpreting professions".

Selected publications

Scholarly works

Translations

.

See also

American Translators Association
Interlingua
Language education
Translation

References

External links
Alexander Gode von Aesch Papers - Biographical information, photographs, and correspondence collected by the University Library at Albany State University, New York
Biographias - Alexander Gottfried Friedrich Gode-von Aesch - Biography in Interlingua
November 1970 newsletter from the American Medical Writers Association - Obituary (in PDF format)
 Union Mundial pro Interlingua

1906 births
1970 deaths
Linguists from the United States
Linguists from Germany
Interlingua
Interlingua speakers
Constructed language creators
20th-century American translators
20th-century linguists
German emigrants to the United States
Presidents of the American Translators Association